Mohammad Kabir Khan (born 12 April 1974) is a Pakistani cricketer. He was a right-handed batsman and a left-arm medium-fast bowler who played for the Pakistan national cricket team. He was the coach of the Afghanistan national cricket team, before resigning his post citing interference with the Afghanistan board management. on 31 December 2011 he was again appointed coach of Afghanistan national cricket team for a period of 3 Years. He is the key person to take Afghanistan to 2010 ICC World Twenty20 and 2012 ICC World Twenty20.

Background
Kabir Khan was born in Peshawar, Khyber Pakhtunkhwa, Pakistan in 1979. He is an ethnic Pashtun.

Playing career
A seam bowler with considerable pace, Khan first played on the Sri Lankan tour of 1994–95, and made sporadic one-day appearances for the next six years. However, he never established a long-term role in the side, having only participated in ten One Day International, finding it tough to break into a Pakistan side sporting both Wasim Akram and Waqar Younis. This was despite a respectable bowling average of just over 25. Khan ended up playing 4 Test matches and 10 One Day Internationals for Pakistan.

He still plays league cricket in the United Kingdom, currently for Stirling County Cricket Club in Scotland as the club's professional.

Coaching career
After retiring from first-class cricket last in 2005, Kabir became the coach of the Habib Bank Limited cricket team side and after gaining experience there, he coached the United Arab Emirates national cricket team.  Khan is a highly qualified ECB Level 3 coach.

Khan was the coach of Afghanistan national cricket team and guided them from the 2008 ICC World Cricket League Division Five, through Division Four and Division Three to One Day International status during the 2009 ICC World Cup Qualifier. Shortly after Afghanistan achieved ODI status, Khan dropped Hasti Gul for their first first-class match in the ICC Intercontinental Cup match against Zimbabwe XI. This led Gul's brother Karim Sadiq to quit the national setup, citing what he called "injustices" and "wrong policies", accusing national coach Kabir Khan of not acting in the best interest of the team. Sadiq later returned to play for Afghanistan.  He guided Afghanistan to victory in the 2010 ICC World Twenty20 Qualifier, which allowed them to historically qualify for the 2010 ICC World Twenty20; during the tournament Afghanistan lost both of their matches to India and South Africa.

On 19 August 2010, Khan quit as the Afghanistan coach, citing interference from officials in the Afghanistan Cricket Board during their tour to Scotland; Khan left Afghanistan top of the Intercontinental Cup and ranked 13th in the world in one-day cricket.

On 2 October 2010, Khan took over as the coach of UAE. Kabir Khan was given a 3-year contract to coach Afghanistan on 31 December 2011.

References

External links

1974 births
Living people
Cricketers from Peshawar
Pakistan One Day International cricketers
Pakistan Test cricketers
Peshawar cricketers
Habib Bank Limited cricketers
Pashtun people
Pakistani cricket coaches
Pakistani cricketers
House Building Finance Corporation cricketers
Coaches of the United Arab Emirates national cricket team
Coaches of the Afghanistan national cricket team
Pakistani people of Afghan descent
Pakistani expatriates in Afghanistan
Edwardes College alumni